The Acidimicrobiia are a class of Actinomycetota, in which three families, eight genera, and nine species have been described, Acidimicrobium ferrooxidans is the type species of the order.

Phylogeny

Taxonomy
The currently accepted taxonomy is based on the List of Prokaryotic names with Standing in Nomenclature (LPSN) and National Center for Biotechnology Information (NCBI).

 Order "Actinomarinales" Ghai et al. 2013
 Family "Actinomarinaceae" Ghai et al. 2013
 Genus "Candidatus Actinomarina" Ghai et al. 2013
 Order Acidimicrobiales Stackebrandt, Rainey & Ward-Rainey 1997
 Genus ?Acidithiomicrobium Davis-Belmar & Norris 2009
 Family Acidimicrobiaceae Stackebrandt, Rainey & Ward-Rainey 1997
 Genus ?Acidiferrimicrobium González et al. 2020
 Genus ?Aciditerrimonas Itoh et al. 2011 
 Genus Acidimicrobium Clark & Norris 1996
 Genus "Acidithrix" Kay et al. 2013/Jones & Johnson 2015
 Genus Ferrimicrobium Johnson et al. 2009
 Genus Ferrithrix Johnson et al. 2009
 Family Iamiaceae Iamiaceae
 Genus Actinomarinicola He et al. 2020
 Genus Aquihabitans Jin et al. 2013
 Genus Iamia Kurahashi et al. 2009
 Genus Rhabdothermincola Liu et al. 2021
 Family Ilumatobacteraceae Asem et al. 2018
 Genus Desertimonas Asem et al. 2018
 Genus Ilumatobacter Matsumoto et al. 2009
 Family "Microtrichaceae" Joseph et al. 2003
 Genus ?"Candidatus Limnosphaera" Kim, Kang & Cho 2017
 Genus "Candidatus Neomicrothrix" corrig. Blackall et al. 1996 ["Ca. Microthrix" Blackall et al. 1996 non Ragonot 1888]

See also
 List of bacterial orders

References 

Actinomycetota